Philadelph Van Trump (November 15, 1810 – July 31, 1874) was an American politician who served as a U.S. Representative from Ohio from 1867 to 1873.

Biography 
Born in Lancaster, Ohio, Van Trump attended a public school. He learned the art of printing and subsequently became editor of the Gazette and Enquirer at Lancaster. He also studied law and was admitted to the bar. He started practice in Lancaster on May 14, 1838. He served as delegate to the Whig National Convention in 1852. In 1856, Van Trump was an unsuccessful candidate of the American Party for Governor. He served as delegate to the Bell and Everett State convention in 1860 and served as president. He served as judge of the court of common pleas from 1862 to 1867. Van Trump failed in elections to be a judge on the Supreme Court of Ohio in 1863, 1864, and 1865.

Van Trump was elected as a Democrat to the Fortieth, Forty-first, and Forty-second Congresses (March 4, 1867 – March 3, 1873). He was not a candidate for renomination in 1872. He served as president of the Democratic State convention in 1869. Van Trump resumed the practice of law in Lancaster, Ohio, and died there on July 31, 1874. He is buried in Elmwood Cemetery.

Sources

External links

1810 births
1874 deaths
People from Lancaster, Ohio
Editors of Ohio newspapers
Ohio lawyers
Ohio Whigs
Democratic Party members of the United States House of Representatives from Ohio
Ohio Know Nothings
19th-century American politicians
19th-century American lawyers